Contai Model Institution,  established in 1883,  is one of the oldest schools located in the sub-divisional town of Contai, Purba Medinipur, West Bengal, India.

The school follows the course curricula of West Bengal Board of Secondary Education (WBBSE) and West Bengal Council of Higher Secondary Education (WBCHSE) for Standard 10th and 12th Board examinations respectively.

Sections 
It has a Primary Section: (Class I - IV),  Secondary (Class V - X), and Higher Secondary (Class XI - XII)

Facilities 

 Hostel
 Computer Lab
 Laboratory (Chemistry,Physics Biology)
 Playground
 Canteen

Subjects - Higher Secondary 
Bengali, English (common for all)

Science 

 Physics
 Chemistry
 Mathematics
 Biological Sciences

Arts 

 History / Agronomy
 Geography
 Sanskrit / Economics
 Political Science
 Computer Application
 Nutrition

Commerce 

 Accountancy
 Business Studies
 Economics
 Costing and Taxation
 Commercial Law & Preliminaries of Auditing
 Computer Application

School Timings 
Monday to Friday - 10:30 A.M. to 04:30 P.M.

Saturday - 10:30 AM to 02:00 PM.

Sunday - Closed.

Address 
Puratan Bari, Contai, West Bengal. Pin - 721401

Website 
Contai Model Institution

References

High schools and secondary schools in West Bengal
Schools in Purba Medinipur district
Educational institutions established in 1883
1883 establishments in India